James Carruthers Greenough (August 15, 1829 – December 4, 1924) was an American educator who served as the third principal of the Rhode Island Normal School, sixth president of the Massachusetts Agricultural College, and seventh principal of the Westfield State Normal School. He was also an outspoken advocate of Christian teachings in public academic institutions, a fellow of the American Institute of Instruction, and author of a treatise on the British education system.

He was a member of the Central Congregational Church in Providence.

Selected works
 "The Proper Work of Normal Schools" (1872)
"Methods and Results" (1881)
Address on Col. Marshall Pinckney Wilder (1883)
"The Place and the Work of the State College" (1883)
"Morality and Religion in the Public School" (1887)
"The Relation of the College to Pedagogics" (1893)
"The Evolution of the Elementary Schools of Great Britain" (1903)
"A History of the Town of Westfield" (1919)

References

External links

James C. Greenough Papers
James C. Greenough, YouMass, University of Massachusetts Amherst
James C. Greenough, Past Chancellors & Presidents on the Amherst Campus, University of Massachusetts Amherst.

1829 births
1924 deaths
People from Wendell, Massachusetts
Rhode Island College faculty
Leaders of the University of Massachusetts Amherst
Westfield State University faculty
Williams College alumni
Writers from Massachusetts